Mimetillus is a genus of vesper bat in the family Vespertilionidae. It contains two species, both known as mimic bats and found in sub-Saharan Africa.

There are two species in this genus:

 Moloney's mimic bat, Mimetillus moloneyi
 Thomas's mimic bat, Mimetillus thomasi

Previously, Mimetillus was thought to be a monotypic genus containing only M. moloneyi, but phylogenetic evidence has found M. thomasi to be a distinct species.

References 

Mimetillus
Bat genera
Taxa named by Oldfield Thomas